Roman Broniš (born 17 October 1976) is a Slovak former road cyclist, who now works as a directeur sportif for UCI Continental team . He represented his nation Slovakia in two editions of the Olympic Games (2000 and 2008).

Career
Born in Bánovce nad Bebravou, Broniš made his official debut as an amateur cyclist at the 2000 Summer Olympics in Sydney, where he did not finish the men's road race against a vast field of more than a hundred cyclists. Broniš later turned professional in 2004, when he signed a two-year contract with Ed' System ZVVZ. Throughout his early sporting career, he competed for three annually contractual cycling teams (and ), and also produced numerous triumphs at different stages in both local and global road cycling tournaments, specifically in Coupe des Carpathes (Poland), Tour du Maroc (Morocco), Tour of Libya, and UAE International Emirates Post Tour.

Eight years after competing in his last Olympics, Broniš qualified for his second Slovak squad, as a 33-year-old, in the men's road race at the 2008 Summer Olympics in Beijing by receiving one of the team's three berths from the UCI Europe Tour, along with his teammates Matej Jurčo and Ján Valach. Passing through the  mark, Broniš could not achieve a best possible result with a severe fatigue under the Beijing's intense heat, as he failed to complete the race for the second straight time in his Olympic career.

Major results

2001
 National Road Championships
2nd Team time trial
3rd Road race
2002
 1st Stage 1 Tour of Saudi Arabia
 3rd Team time trial, National Road Championships
2003
 1st Grand Prix Bradlo
 1st Stage 3 Grand Prix Cycliste de Gemenc
 2nd Coupe des Carpathes
 3rd Road race, National Road Championships
2005
 3rd Road race, National Road Championships
2006
 1st Overall Tour du Maroc
 1st Coupe des Carpathes
2007
 1st Overall Bałtyk–Karkonosze Tour
2008
 National Road Championships
2nd Road race
3rd Time trial
 2nd Overall Tour of Libya
1st Stages 2, 3, 4 & 7
 3rd Overall UAE International Emirates Post Tour
1st Stage 4
 3rd Overall Bałtyk–Karkonosze Tour
2009
 1st  Time trial, National Road Championships
 9th Overall Okolo Slovenska
2011
 2nd Time trial, National Road Championships
 3rd Overall Course de Solidarność et des Champions Olympiques
 4th Overall Grand Prix Chantal Biya
2012
 National Road Championships
4th Road race
5th Time trial
2013
 5th Road race, National Road Championships
2016
 3rd Time trial, National Road Championships
 5th Memoriał Andrzeja Trochanowskiego

References

External links

NBC 2008 Olympics profile

1976 births
Living people
Slovak male cyclists
Cyclists at the 2000 Summer Olympics
Cyclists at the 2008 Summer Olympics
Olympic cyclists of Slovakia
People from Bánovce nad Bebravou
Sportspeople from the Trenčín Region